German submarine U-3509 was a Type XXI U-boat of Nazi Germany's Kriegsmarine during World War II. The Elektroboote submarine was laid down on 29 July 1944 at the Schichau-Werke yard at Danzig, launched on 27 September 1944, and commissioned on 29 January 1945 under the command of Oberleutnant zur See Karl-Heinz Voswinkel.

U-3509 was a brand new, high technology electric boat which could run constantly submerged rather than having to surface to recharge her batteries every day the way submarines until that point had had to do. However, these advanced vessels were introduced to the Kriegsmarine only late in 1944, much too late to influence the Battle of the Atlantic, and too late for many of them to serve in an offensive capacity at all.

With the end of the war near, training on U-boats had dropped to a minimum due to lack of fuel, falling morale and the effectiveness of allied attacks on U-boat construction and preparation. The exception to this were the new Type XXI boats, which continued to train in the Baltic Sea.

Design
Like all Type XXI U-boats, U-3509 had a displacement of  when at the surface and  while submerged. The submarine was powered by two MAN SE supercharged six-cylinder M6V40/46KBB diesel engines each providing , two Siemens-Schuckert GU365/30 double-acting electric motors each providing , and two Siemens-Schuckert silent running GV232/28 electric motors each providing .

U-3509 was fitted with six  torpedo tubes in the bow and four  C/30 anti-aircraft guns. She could carry twenty-three torpedoes or seventeen torpedoes and twelve mines. The complement was five officers and fifty-two men.

Fate
U-3509 was damaged whilst under construction in September 1944 during an air raid, but she was eventually repaired and completed.

U-3509 was scuttled by her crew on 3 May 1945 in the River Weser estuary, Germany.

References

Bibliography

External links
 

World War II submarines of Germany
Type XXI submarines
World War II shipwrecks in the North Sea
U-boats commissioned in 1945
1944 ships
Ships built in Danzig
Ships built by Schichau
Operation Regenbogen (U-boat)
Maritime incidents in May 1945